Ahmadabad-e Mostowfi District is in Eslamshahr County, Tehran province, Iran. At the latest National Census in 2016, the district had 22,611 inhabitants in 6,700 households. The district was established on 16 April 2012.

References 

Eslamshahr County

Districts of Tehran Province

Populated places in Tehran Province

Populated places in Eslamshahr County